is a Japanese businessman, who has been chairman of Toyota since 2013.　He graduated from Nagoya University. He is known as the "father of the Prius" for his role in leading the development of the Toyota Prius, the world's best-selling hybrid electric vehicle in history.

References

External links
Takeshi Uchiyamada, Chairman of the Board of Directors (Representative Director)

1946 births
Living people
Japanese business executives
Japanese chairpersons of corporations
Toyota people
Nagoya University alumni